Chung Hee-seok (born January 29, 1977) is a former professional South Korean tennis player.

Chung reached his highest individual ranking on the ATP Tour on May 27, 2002, when he became World number 482.  He played primarily on the Futures circuit and the Challenger circuit.

Chung was a member of the South Korean Davis Cup team, posting a 7–3 record in singles and a 7–5 record in doubles in thirteen ties played.

Career finals

Singles – all levels (6–3)

External links
 
 

1977 births
Living people
South Korean male tennis players
Asian Games medalists in tennis
Tennis players at the 2002 Asian Games
Tennis players at the 2006 Asian Games
Asian Games gold medalists for South Korea
Asian Games silver medalists for South Korea
Medalists at the 2002 Asian Games
Medalists at the 2006 Asian Games
20th-century South Korean people
21st-century South Korean people